Melecta pacifica is a species of hymenopteran in the family Apidae. It is found in North America.

Subspecies
These three subspecies belong to the species Melecta pacifica:
 Melecta pacifica atlantica Linsley, 1943
 Melecta pacifica fulvida Cresson, 1878
 Melecta pacifica pacifica Cresson, 1878

References

Further reading

External links

 

Apinae
Articles created by Qbugbot
Insects described in 1878